Sir Derek Alton Walcott    (23 January 1930 – 17 March 2017) was a Saint Lucian poet and playwright. He received the 1992 Nobel Prize in Literature. His works include the Homeric epic poem Omeros (1990), which many critics view "as Walcott's major achievement." In addition to winning the Nobel Prize, Walcott received many literary awards over the course of his career, including an Obie Award in 1971 for his play Dream on Monkey Mountain, a MacArthur Foundation "genius" award, a Royal Society of Literature Award, the Queen's Medal for Poetry, the inaugural OCM Bocas Prize for Caribbean Literature, the 2010 T. S. Eliot Prize for his book of poetry White Egrets and the Griffin Trust For Excellence in Poetry Lifetime Recognition Award in 2015.

Early life and childhood
Walcott was born and raised in Castries, Saint Lucia, in the West Indies, the son of Alix (Maarlin) and Warwick Walcott. He had a twin brother, the playwright Roderick Walcott, and a sister, Pamela Walcott. His family is of English, Dutch and African descent, reflecting the complex colonial history of the island that he explores in his poetry. His mother, a teacher, loved the arts and often recited poetry around the house. His father was a civil servant and a talented painter. He died when Walcott and his brother were one year old, and were left to be raised by their mother. Walcott was brought up in Methodist schools. His mother, who was a teacher at a Methodist elementary school, provided her children with an environment where their talents could be nurtured. Walcott's family was part of a minority Methodist community, who felt overshadowed by the dominant Catholic culture of the island established during French colonial rule.

As a young man Walcott trained as a painter, mentored by Harold Simmons, whose life as a professional artist provided an inspiring example for him.  Walcott greatly admired Cézanne and Giorgione and sought to learn from them. Walcott's painting was later exhibited at the Anita Shapolsky Gallery in New York City, along with the art of other writers, in a 2007 exhibition named The Writer's Brush: Paintings and Drawing by Writers.

He studied as a writer, becoming "an elated, exuberant poet madly in love with English" and strongly influenced by modernist poets such as T. S. Eliot and Ezra Pound. Walcott had an early sense of a vocation as a writer. In the poem "Midsummer" (1984), he wrote:

Forty years gone, in my island childhood, I felt that 
the gift of poetry had made me one of the chosen, 
that all experience was kindling to the fire of the Muse.

At 14, Walcott published his first poem, a Miltonic, religious poem, in the newspaper The Voice of St Lucia. An English Catholic priest condemned the Methodist-inspired poem as blasphemous in a response printed in the newspaper. By 19, Walcott had self-published his first two collections with the aid of his mother, who paid for the printing: 25 Poems (1948) and Epitaph for the Young: XII Cantos (1949).  He sold copies to his friends and covered the costs. He later commented:

I went to my mother and said, "I’d like to publish a book of poems, and I think it's going to cost me two hundred dollars." She was just a seamstress and a schoolteacher, and I remember her being very upset because she wanted to do it. Somehow she got it—a lot of money for a woman to have found on her salary. She gave it to me, and I sent off to Trinidad and had the book printed. When the books came back I would sell them to friends. I made the money back.

The influential Bajan poet Frank Collymore critically supported Walcott's early work.

After attending high school at Saint Mary's College, he received a scholarship to study at the University College of the West Indies in Kingston, Jamaica.

Career 

After graduation, Walcott moved to Trinidad in 1953, where he became a critic, teacher and journalist. He founded the Trinidad Theatre Workshop in 1959 and remained active with its board of directors.

Exploring the Caribbean and its history in a colonialist and post-colonialist context, his collection In a Green Night: Poems 1948–1960 (1962) attracted international attention. His play Dream on Monkey Mountain (1970) was produced on NBC-TV in the United States the year it was published. Makak is the protagonist in this play; and "Makak‟s condition represents the condition of the colonized natives under the oppressive forces of the powerful colonizers". In 1971 it was produced by the Negro Ensemble Company off-Broadway in New York City; it won an Obie Award that year for "Best Foreign Play". The following year, Walcott won an OBE from the British government for his work.

He was hired as a teacher by Boston University in the United States, where he founded the Boston Playwrights' Theatre in 1981. That year he also received a MacArthur Foundation Fellowship in the United States. Walcott taught literature and writing at Boston University for more than two decades, publishing new books of poetry and plays on a regular basis. Walcott retired from his position at Boston University in 2007. He became friends with other poets, including the Russian expatriate Joseph Brodsky, who lived and worked in the U.S. after being exiled in the 1970s, and the Irishman Seamus Heaney, who also taught in Boston.

Walcott's epic poem Omeros (1990), which loosely echoes and refers to characters from the Iliad, has been critically praised as his "major achievement." The book received praise from publications such as The Washington Post and The New York Times Book Review, which chose Omeros as one of its "Best Books of 1990".

Walcott was awarded the Nobel Prize in Literature in 1992, the second Caribbean writer to receive the honour after Saint-John Perse, who was born in Guadeloupe, received the award in 1960. The Nobel committee described Walcott's work as "a poetic oeuvre of great luminosity, sustained by a historical vision, the outcome of a multicultural commitment". He won an Anisfield-Wolf Book Award for Lifetime Achievement in 2004.

His later poetry collections include Tiepolo's Hound (2000), illustrated with copies of his watercolors; The Prodigal (2004), and White Egrets (2010), which received the T.S. Eliot Prize and the 2011 OCM Bocas Prize for Caribbean Literature.

Derek Walcott held the Elias Ghanem Chair in Creative Writimy at the University of Nevada, Las Vegas in 2007. In 2008, Walcott gave the first Cola Debrot Lectures In 2009, Walcott began a three-year distinguished scholar-in-residence position at the University of Alberta.  In 2010, he became Professor of Poetry at the University of Essex.

As a part of St Lucia's Independence Day celebrations, in February 2016, he became one of the first knights of the Order of Saint Lucia.

Writing

Themes
Methodism and spirituality have played a significant role from the beginning in Walcott's work. He commented: "I have never separated the writing of poetry from prayer. I have grown up believing it is a vocation, a religious vocation." Describing his writing process, he wrote: "the body feels it is melting into what it has seen… the 'I' not being important. That is the ecstasy...Ultimately, it's what Yeats says: 'Such a sweetness flows into the breast that we laugh at everything and everything we look upon is blessed.' That’s always there. It’s a benediction, a transference. It’s gratitude, really. The more of that a poet keeps, the more genuine his nature." He also notes, "if one thinks a poem is coming on...you do make a retreat, a withdrawal into some kind of silence that cuts out everything around you. What you’re taking on is really not a renewal of your identity but actually a renewal of your anonymity."

Influences
Walcott said his writing was influenced by the work of the American poets Robert Lowell and Elizabeth Bishop, who were also friends.

Playwriting
He published more than twenty plays, the majority of which have been produced by the Trinidad Theatre Workshop and have also been widely staged elsewhere. Many of them address, either directly or indirectly, the liminal status of the West Indies in the post-colonial period. Through poetry he also explores the paradoxes and complexities of this legacy.

Essays
In his 1970 essay "What the Twilight Says: An Overture", discussing art and theatre in his native region (from Dream on Monkey Mountain and Other Plays), Walcott reflects on the West Indies as colonized space.  He discusses the problems for an artist of a region with little in the way of truly Indigenous forms, and with little national or nationalist identity. He states: "We are all strangers here... Our bodies think in one language and move in another". The epistemological effects of colonization inform plays such as Ti-Jean and his Brothers. Mi-Jean, one of the eponymous brothers, is shown to have much information, but to truly know nothing. Every line Mi-Jean recites is rote knowledge gained from the coloniser; he is unable to synthesize it or apply it to his life as a colonised person.

Walcott notes of growing up in West Indian culture:

What we were deprived of was also our privilege. There was a great joy in making a world that so far, up to then, had been undefined... My generation of West Indian writers has felt such a powerful elation at having the privilege of writing about places and people for the first time and, simultaneously, having behind them the tradition of knowing how well it can be done—by a Defoe, a Dickens, a Richardson.

Walcott identified as "absolutely a Caribbean writer", a pioneer, helping to make sense of the legacy of deep colonial damage. In such poems as "The Castaway" (1965) and in the play Pantomime (1978), he uses the metaphors of shipwreck and Crusoe to describe the culture and what is required of artists after colonialism and slavery: both the freedom and the challenge to begin again, salvage the best of other cultures and make something new. These images recur in later work as well. He writes: "If we continue to sulk and say, Look at what the slave-owner did, and so forth, we will never mature. While we sit moping or writing morose poems and novels that glorify a non-existent past, then time passes us by."

Omeros

Walcott's epic book-length poem Omeros was published in 1990 to critical acclaim. The poem very loosely echoes and references Homer and some of his major characters from The Iliad. Some of the poem's major characters include the island fishermen Achille and Hector, the retired English officer Major Plunkett and his wife Maud, the housemaid Helen, the blind man Seven Seas (who symbolically represents Homer), and the author himself.

Although the main narrative of the poem takes place on the island of St. Lucia, where Walcott was born and raised, Walcott also includes scenes from Brookline, Massachusetts (where Walcott was living and teaching at the time of the poem's composition), and the character Achille imagines a voyage from Africa onto a slave ship that is headed for the Americas; also, in Book Five of the poem, Walcott narrates some of his travel experiences in a variety of cities around the world, including Lisbon, London, Dublin, Rome, and Toronto.
 
Composed in a variation on terza rima, the work explores the themes that run throughout Walcott's oeuvre: the beauty of the islands, the colonial burden, the fragmentation of Caribbean identity, and the role of the poet in a post-colonial world.

In this epic, Walcott speaks in favor of unique Caribbean cultures and traditions to challenge the modernity that existed as a consequence of colonialism.

Criticism and praise
Walcott's work has received praise from major poets including Robert Graves, who wrote that Walcott "handles English with a closer understanding of its inner magic than most, if not any, of his contemporaries", and Joseph Brodsky, who praised Walcott's work, writing: "For almost forty years his throbbing and relentless lines kept arriving in the English language like tidal waves, coagulating into an archipelago of poems without which the map of modern literature would effectively match wallpaper. He gives us more than himself or 'a world'; he gives us a sense of infinity embodied in the language." Walcott noted that he, Brodsky, and the Irish poet Seamus Heaney, who all taught in the United States, were a band of poets "outside the American experience".

The poetry critic William Logan critiqued Walcott's work in a New York Times book review of Walcott's Selected Poems. While he praised Walcott's writing in Sea Grapes and The Arkansas Testament, Logan had mostly negative things to say about Walcott's poetry, calling Omeros "clumsy" and Another Life "pretentious." He concluded with "No living poet has written verse more delicately rendered or distinguished than Walcott, though few individual poems seem destined to be remembered."

Most reviews of Walcott's work are more positive. For instance, in The New Yorker review of The Poetry of Derek Walcott, Adam Kirsch had high praise for Walcott's oeuvre, describing his style in the following manner:

By combining the grammar of vision with the freedom of metaphor, Walcott produces a beautiful style that is also a philosophical style. People perceive the world on dual channels, Walcott’s verse suggests, through the senses and through the mind, and each is constantly seeping into the other. The result is a state of perpetual magical thinking, a kind of Alice in Wonderland world where concepts have bodies and landscapes are always liable to get up and start talking.

Kirsch calls Another Life Walcott's "first major peak" and analyzes the painterly qualities of Walcott's imagery from his earliest work through to later books such as Tiepolo's Hound. Kirsch also explores the post-colonial politics in Walcott's work, calling him "the postcolonial writer par excellence". Kirsch calls the early poem "A Far Cry from Africa" a turning point in Walcott's development as a poet. Like Logan, Kirsch is critical of Omeros, which he believes Walcott fails to successfully sustain over its entirety. Although Omeros is the volume of Walcott's that usually receives the most critical praise, Kirsch believes Midsummer to be his best book.

His poetry, as spoken performance, appears briefly in the sampled sounds in the music album of the group Dreadzone. Their track entitled "Captain Dread" from the album Second Light incorporates the fourth verse of Walcott's 1990 poem "The Schooner Flight".

In 2013 Dutch filmmaker Ida Does released Poetry is an Island, a feature documentary film about Walcott's life and the ever-present influence of his birthplace of St Lucia.

Personal life
In 1954 Walcott married Fay Moston, a secretary, and they had a son, the St. Lucian painter Peter Walcott. The marriage ended in divorce in 1959. Walcott married a second time to Margaret Maillard in 1962, who worked as an almoner in a hospital. Together they had two daughters, Elizabeth Walcott-Hackshaw and Anna Walcott-Hardy, before divorcing in 1976. In 1976, Walcott married for a third time, to actress Norline Metivier; they divorced in 1993. His companion until his death was Sigrid Nama, a former art gallery owner.

Walcott was also known for his passion for traveling to countries around the world. He split his time between New York, Boston, and St. Lucia, and incorporated the influences of different locations into his pieces of work.

Allegations of sexual harassment
In 1982, a Harvard sophomore accused Walcott of sexual harassment in September 1981. She alleged that after she refused a sexual advance from him, she was given the only C in the class. In 1996 a student at Boston University sued Walcott for sexual harassment and "offensive sexual physical contact". The two reached a settlement.

In 2009, Walcott was a leading candidate for the position of Oxford Professor of Poetry. He withdrew his candidacy after reports of the accusations against him of sexual harassment from 1981 and 1996. 

When the media learned that pages from an American book on the topic were sent anonymously to a number of Oxford academics, this aroused their interest in the university decisions. Ruth Padel, also a leading candidate, was elected to the post. Within days, The Daily Telegraph reported that she had alerted journalists to the harassment cases. Under severe media and academic pressure, Padel resigned. Padel was the first woman to be elected to the Oxford post, and some journalists attributed the criticism of her to misogyny and a gender war at Oxford. They said that a male poet would not have been so criticized, as she had reported published information, not rumour.

Numerous respected poets, including Seamus Heaney and Al Alvarez, published a letter of support for Walcott in The Times Literary Supplement, and criticized the press furor. Other commentators suggested that both poets were casualties of the media interest in an internal university affair, because the story "had everything, from sex claims to allegations of character assassination". Simon Armitage and other poets expressed regret at Padel's resignation.

Death

Walcott died at his home in Cap Estate, St. Lucia, on 17 March 2017. He was 87. He was given a state funeral on Saturday, 25 March, with a service at the Cathedral Basilica of the Immaculate Conception in Castries and burial at Morne Fortune.

Legacy
In 1993, a public square and park located in central Castries, Saint Lucia, was named Derek Walcott Square. A documentary film, Poetry Is an Island: Derek Walcott, by filmmaker Ida Does, was produced to honor him and his legacy in 2013.

The Saint Lucia National Trust acquired Walcott's childhood home at 17 Chaussée Road, Castries, in November 2015, renovating it before opening it to the public as Walcott House in January 2016.

In January 2020 the Sir Arthur Lewis Community College in St. Lucia announced that Walcott's books on Caribbean Literature and poetry have been donated to its Library.

Awards and honours
 1969: Cholmondeley Award
 1971: Obie Award for Best Foreign Play (for Dream on Monkey Mountain)
 1972: Officer of the Order of the British Empire
 1981: MacArthur Foundation Fellowship ("genius award")
 1988: Queen's Gold Medal for Poetry
 1990: Arts Council of Wales International Writers Prize
 1990: W. H. Smith Literary Award (for poetry Omeros)
 1992: Nobel Prize in Literature
 2004: Anisfield-Wolf Book Award for Lifetime Achievement
 2008: Honorary doctorate from the University of Essex
 2011: T. S. Eliot Prize (for poetry collection White Egrets)
 2011: OCM Bocas Prize for Caribbean Literature (for White Egrets)
 2015: Griffin Trust For Excellence in Poetry Lifetime Recognition Award
 2016: Knight Commander of the Order of Saint Lucia

List of works

Poetry collections

 1948: 25 Poems
 1949: Epitaph for the Young: Xll Cantos
 1951: Poems
 1962: In a Green Night: Poems 1948—60
 1964: Selected Poems
 1965: The Castaway and Other Poems
 1969: The Gulf and Other Poems
 1973: Another Life
 1976: Sea Grapes
 1979: The Star-Apple Kingdom
 1981: Selected Poetry
 1981: The Fortunate Traveller
 1983: The Caribbean Poetry of Derek Walcott and the Art of Romare Bearden
 1984: Midsummer
 1986 Collected Poems, 1948–1984, featuring "Love After Love"
 1987: The Arkansas Testament
 1990: Omeros
 1997: The Bounty
 2000: Tiepolo's Hound, includes Walcott's watercolors
 2004: The Prodigal
 2007: Selected Poems (edited, selected, and with an introduction by Edward Baugh)
 2010: White Egrets
 2014: The Poetry of Derek Walcott 1948–2013
 2016: Morning, Paramin (illustrated by Peter Doig)

Plays

 1950: Henri Christophe: A Chronicle in Seven Scenes
 1952: Harry Dernier: A Play for Radio Production
 1953: Wine of the Country
 1954: The Sea at Dauphin: A Play in One Act
 1957: Ione
 1958: Drums and Colours: An Epic Drama
 1958: Ti-Jean and His Brothers
 1966: Malcochon: or, Six in the Rain
 1967: Dream on Monkey Mountain
 1970: In a Fine Castle
 1974: The Joker of Seville
 1974: The Charlatan
 1976: O Babylon!
 1977: Remembrance
 1978: Pantomime
 1980: The Joker of Seville and O Babylon!: Two Plays
 1982: The Isle Is Full of Noises
 1984: The Haitian Earth
 1986: Three Plays: The Last Carnival, Beef, No Chicken, and A Branch of the Blue Nile
 1991: Steel
 1993: Odyssey: A Stage Version
 1997: The Capeman (book and lyrics, both in collaboration with Paul Simon)
 2002: Walker and The Ghost Dance
 2011: Moon-Child
 2014: O Starry Starry Night

Other books
 1990: The Poet in the Theatre, Poetry Book Society (London)
 1993: The Antilles: Fragments of Epic Memory Farrar, Straus (New York)
 1996: Conversations with Derek Walcott, University of Mississippi (Jackson, MS)
 1996: (With Joseph Brodsky and Seamus Heaney) Homage to Robert Frost, Farrar, Straus (New York)
 1998: What the Twilight Says (essays), Farrar, Straus (New York, NY)
 2002: Walker and Ghost Dance, Farrar, Straus (New York, NY)
 2004: Another Life: Fully Annotated, Lynne Rienner Publishers (Boulder, CO)

See also
Black Nobel Prize laureates
 "Love After Love", a poem by Derek Walcott
 Omeros, epic poetry by Derek Walcott
 Caribbean Epic

References

Further reading
 Abani, Chris. The myth of fingerprints: Signifying as displacement in Derek Walcott's “Omeros”. University of Southern California, PhD dissertation. 2006.
 Abodunrin, Femi. "The Muse of History: Derek Walcott and the Topos of {Un} naming in West Indian Writing." Journal of West Indian Literature 7, no. 1 (1996): 54-77.
 Amany Abdelkahhar Aldardeer Ahmed, Amany. "The Quest for a Cultural Identity in Derek Walcott's Another Life." مجلة کلية الآداب 57, no. 3 (2020): 101-146.
 Baer, William, ed. Conversations with Derek Walcott. Jackson: University Press of Mississippi, 1996.
 Baugh, Edward, Derek Walcott. Cambridge: Cambridge University Press, 2006.
 Breslin, Paul, Nobody's Nation: Reading Derek Walcott. Chicago: University of Chicago Press, 2001. 
 Brown, Stewart, ed., The Art of Derek Walcott. Chester Springs, PA.: Dufour, 1991; Bridgend: Seren Books, 1992.
 Burnett, Paula, Derek Walcott: Politics and Poetics. Gainesville: University Press of Florida, 2001.
 Figueroa, John J. "Some subtleties of the isle: A commentary on certain aspects of Derek Walcott's sonnet sequence. Tales of the Islands. (1976): 190-228.
 Fumagalli, Maria Cristina, The Flight of the Vernacular: Seamus Heaney, Derek Walcott and the Impress of Dante. Amsterdam-New York: Rodopi, 2001.
 Fumagalli, Maria Cristina, Agenda 39:1–3 (2002–03), Special Issue on Derek Walcott. Includes Derek Walcott's "Epitaph for the Young" (1949), republished here in its entirety.
 Goddar, Horace I. "Untangling the thematic threads: Derek Walcott's poetry." Kola 21, no. 1 (2009): 120-131.
 Goddard, Horace I. "The Rediscovery of Ancestral Experience in Derek Walcott's Early Poetry." Kola 29, no. 2 (2017): 24-40.
 Hamner, Robert D., Derek Walcott. Updated edition. Twayne's World Authors Series. TWAS 600. New York: Twayne, 1993.
 Izevbaye, D. S. "The Exile and the Prodigal: Derek Walcott as West Indian Poet." Caribbean Quarterly 26, no. 1-2 (1980): 70-82.
 King, Bruce, Derek Walcott and West Indian Drama: "Not Only a Playwright But a Company": The Trinidad Theatre Workshop 1959–1993. Oxford: Clarendon Press, 1995.
 King, Bruce, Derek Walcott, A Caribbean Life. Oxford: Oxford University Press, 2000.
 Marks, Susan Jane. That terrible vowel, that I: autobiography and Derek Walcott's Another life. Master's thesis, University of Cape Town, 1989.
 
 
 Terada, Rei, Derek Walcott's Poetry: American Mimicry. Boston: Northeastern University Press, 1992.
 Thieme, John, Derek Walcott. Manchester: Manchester University Press, 1999.

External links
 

 British Council writers' profile, works listing, critical review
 Profile, poems written and audio at Poetry Archive 
 Profile and poems at Poetry Foundation
 Profile, poems audio and written, Poetry of American Poets
 Profile and analysis, Emory University
 Profile, interviews, articles, archive. Prague Writers' Festival
 Edward Hirsch, "Derek Walcott, The Art of Poetry No. 37", The Paris Review, Winter 1986
 Lannan Foundation Reading and Conversation With Glyn Maxwell. November 2002 (audio).
 Biography available in Saint Lucians and the Order of CARICOM
 
 Appearance on Desert Island Discs, BBC Radio 4, 9 June 1991
 

1930 births
2017 deaths
Twin people
Boston University faculty
Columbia University faculty
Formalist poets
Harvard University people
MacArthur Fellows
Nobel laureates in Literature
Officers of the Order of the British Empire
Recipients of the Order of Merit (Jamaica)
People from Castries Quarter
People from Greenwich Village
Saint Lucian dramatists and playwrights
Saint Lucian Nobel laureates
20th-century Saint Lucian poets
Trinidad and Tobago dramatists and playwrights
Alumni of University of London Worldwide
Alumni of the University of London
Violence against women in the United States
University of the West Indies alumni
20th-century dramatists and playwrights
21st-century dramatists and playwrights
21st-century Saint Lucian poets
Saint Lucian male poets
20th-century male writers
21st-century male writers
PEN Oakland/Josephine Miles Literary Award winners
Epic poets
T. S. Eliot Prize winners
Recipients of the Order of the Caribbean Community